In the 2020–21 season, Jagiellonia Białystok competed in Ekstraklasa, and the season's Polish Cup edition, as they were eliminated by Górnik Zabrze, following the 1–3 defeat in the round of 64.

Players

Competitions

Ekstraklasa

Standings

Matches

Polish Cup

References

Jagiellonia Białystok
Jagiellonia Białystok